The 1982 Oklahoma Sooners football team represented the University of Oklahoma during the 1982 NCAA Division I-A football season. They played their home games at Oklahoma Memorial Stadium and competed as members of the Big Eight Conference. They were coached by head coach Barry Switzer. The Sooners lost to Arizona State 32-21 in the Fiesta Bowl in Tempe, Arizona.

Schedule

Roster

Game summaries

Texas

at Colorado

Marcus Dupree returned a punt 77 yards for a touchdown, safety Keith Stanberry ran an interception back 49 yard for a score, and tailback Fred Sims rushed for two touchdowns.

at Nebraska

vs. Arizona State (Fiesta Bowl)

Rankings

Postseason

NFL draft
The following players were drafted into the National Football League following the season.

References

Oklahoma
Oklahoma Sooners football seasons
Oklahoma Sooners football